Mimemodes is a genus of beetles in the family Monotomidae, containing the following species:

 Mimemodes bhutus Sen Gupta, 1976
 Mimemodes carenifrons Grouvelle, 1913
 Mimemodes cribratus Reitter, 1874
 Mimemodes emmerichi Mader, 1937
 Mimemodes frigidus Grouvelle, 1906
 Mimemodes harmandi (Grouvelle, 1903)
 Mimemodes insulare Grouvelle, 1897
 Mimemodes japonus Reitter, 1874
 Mimemodes kimbhutus Sen Gupta, 1976
 Mimemodes koebelei Blackburn, 1902
 Mimemodes laticeps (Macleay, 1871)
 Mimemodes megalocephalus Champion, 1924
 Mimemodes monstrosum (Reitter, 1874)
 Mimemodes nigratus Sen Gupta, 1976
 Mimemodes proximus Grouvelle, 1913

References

Cucujoidea genera
Monotomidae